Going Crazy may refer to:

 "Going Crazy" (Song Jieun song), 2011
 "Goin' Crazy" (Dizzee Rascal song), 2013
 "Goin' Crazy" (Natalie song), 2005
"Goin’ Crazy", a song by Ashley Tisdale from Headstrong
 "Goin' Crazy!", a song by David Lee Roth from Eat 'Em and Smile
 "Going Crazy", a song by Exo from The War
 "Going Grazy", a song by The Haircuts from a sketch on Your Show of Shows
 "Going Crazy", a song by Lee Hyori from Monochrome
 "Going Crazy", a song by Teen Top from It's 
 "Going Crazy", a song by Kan Mi-youn
 "Going Crazy", a song by Twice from The Story Begins
 "Going Crazy", a 2016 song by Hardwell and Blasterjaxx

See also
 I Go Crazy (disambiguation)